Rock 'N Learn is an American children's educational program brand. It covers many of the necessary elements of learning children encounter throughout childhood. Topics include fundamentals for young children such as the English alphabet, to a higher level for children who may have difficulty learning multiplication tables, to those for teenagers in high school who need to improve their writing skills. Releases of titles today include DVDs and digital copy download formats (for video versions) and CDs and books (for audio versions). However, titles (released on video and audio versions) were formerly available on the VHS video cassette tapes and audio cassettes with books. Multiplication Rock was the first title published in 1987.

History 

In 1987, school psychologist Richard Caudle saw that children needed the use of music that they enjoyed to help them learn. Assisted by his musician brother Brad Caudle, Richard Caudle released the first video and audio release Multiplication Rock (on VHS video, book, and audio cassette). This title featured practice with multiplication tables. The success of this release spawned more educational content from Richard and Brad, eventually forming the company called Rock 'N Learn.

The first other titles --after Multiplication Rock-- were the video versions of Addition and Subtraction Rock, Multiplication Rap, Division Rap, and Addition and Subtraction Rap. (That is, with the addition of Division Rock, the audio versions of Addition Rap and Subtraction Rap, Multiplication Country, and Addition and Subtraction Country.) The next others were Alphabet (video and audio), Colors, Shapes & Counting (video and audio), Nursery Rhymes (video and audio), Animals (audio release discontinued around mid 2006 --but replaced with the Dance with the Animals DVD released around in the fall of 2006, though this does focus with the same title as the former Animals title), and Letter Sounds (video and audio).  Later came a two-volume VHS release (Phonics Volumes I and II). (That is, with the addition of the audio release of Phonics Volume I and Phonics Volume II --and finally Grammar but only on audio version.) The "phonics" titles (that being, Letter Sounds and Phonics Volumes I and II) featured more complex foundations for learning to read. Many video releases were released as well --as well as audio releases with each audio title including a book-- to coincide with the audio version (on cassette and CD). DVDs (for video versions of titles) have been released since 2006.

Melissa, Brad's wife, has been known to write Rock 'N Learn's products, as well as consulting teachers for educational input. Richard's wife, Kathie, is the company's director of marketing. Over the years, a plethora of releases came along, including Alphabet Circus, Spanish, and Money & Making Change. Some math releases are released using diverse musical genres; rock, rap, and country. Several releases come in both video and audio formats, while others come in either the former or the latter.

While Rock 'N Learn does keep what benefits children in their products, some releases have been renovated to appeal to a new generation of children. 2010 saw the renovation of Phonics, with the animation improving as well as new character designs. Several new scenes were adding including phonemic awareness exercises, sentence practice, and story practice. Formerly, both volumes were roughly forty-five minutes in length and shared the same DVD disc. However, following the renovation, each volume has extended to a running time of at least seventy minutes, prompting both volumes to require separate discs. This went on for over six years, until 2016, when it was renovated again, improving the animation, as well as some slight alterations. Not long after that, the volumes themselves were split in two, with each of the four parts having a running time between twenty-eight and forty-four minutes, as well as all parts being on a separate disc and being sold together in the Phonics 4-DVD Set.

2011 saw the release of Sight Words Level 1, previously released as simply titled Sight Words. Sight Words Level 2 and Sight Words Level 3 are available as well. 2010, 2012, and 2018 saw the renovation of the video versions (DVD only) of the Letter Sounds, Colors, Shapes & Counting, Alphabet, Telling Time, and Nursery Rhymes titles. However some titles have been discontinued. These titles include Division Rock (all formats on audio --including audio cassette, CD, and book), Division Rap (audio only --including audio cassette, CD, and book),  Alphabet (audio only --audio cassette, CD, and book), Aprendamos Inglés DVD for teaching ESL, and the three 1997 science titles (including Dinosaur Rap, Oceans, and Spiders and Insects). The video version of Alphabet (DVD) is still available but the audio version (all formats --CD and book) have been discontinued. Rock N' Learn has won over 200 awards. Most of them are listed below.

On October 12th, 2021, Brad passed away at the age of 54 due to complications of COVID-19. He was survived by his wife Melissa and his brother Richard, among other family members and friends.

Titles

The following tables show a list of titles of the programs Rock 'N Learn has produced, as well as their respective running time, age range, the number of awards won, and whether or not they are available on video and audio versions (DVD for video; CD and book for audio). (That is, answered by a "Yes", "No", or "Formerly".) 

Early Childhood Titles

Phonics Reading and Writing Titles

Math Titles

Languages Titles

Science and Social Studies Titles

Board Books

Discontinued Titles

References

External links 
Rock 'N Learn Website – official children's educational entertainment program brand website

Rock 'N Learn YouTube Channel – official children's educational entertainment program brand YouTube channel

Education companies of the United States
Educational software companies